Ezra Warner may refer to: 

Ezra Warner (inventor), American inventor of the first can opener in 1858
Ezra J. Warner (historian) (1910 – 1974), American Civil War historian